Órlaith (older spelling: Órfhlaith, newer spelling: Orlagh Órla) is an Irish language female given name. The meaning of the name derives from Ór, meaning "Golden" and Flaith, meaning "prince" although as names with "flaith" suffixes are almost always exclusively feminine, this is usually interpreted as meaning "princess". The retention of the 'fh' within the spelling maintains the ability to easily derive the true meaning of the name, but as this is silent, it is common to see this redacted. All spellings of the name are however pronounced the same, as "OR-la".

Bearers of the name
 Órfhlaith Begley, Member of Parliament for the West Tyrone constituency in the United Kingdom parliament.
 Órfhlaith Foyle, Irish author.
 Órlaith íngen Cennétig, Queen of Ireland, died 941 (executed).
 Órlaith Ní Maoil Seachnaill, Queen of Midhe, died 1066. 
 Órlaith Nic Cennétich, died 1104. 
 Órlaith Ní Mael Sechlainn, Queen of Connacht, died 1115.
 Órlaith Ní Diarmata, Princess of Moylurg, died 1252.
 Órlaith Ní Conchobair, Princess of Connacht and Abbess, died 1283.
 Orláith Forsythe, member of the Belfast-based band Dea Matrona.

See also
List of Irish-language given names
Orla

External links
 http://medievalscotland.org/kmo/AnnalsIndex/Feminine/Orlaith.shtml

Irish-language feminine given names